If Evolution Is Outlawed, Only Outlaws Will Evolve is the fifth spoken-word album by Jello Biafra.

Track listing

Disc one

Disc two

Disc three

References

1998 albums
Alternative Tentacles albums
Jello Biafra albums
Spoken word albums by American artists